On 4 July 1966 an Air New Zealand Douglas DC-8-52 with the registration ZK-NZB crashed on takeoff on a routine training flight from Auckland International Airport killing 2 of the 5 crew on board.

Aircraft
The aircraft registered ZK-NZB was the second Douglas DC-8-52 delivered new to the airline in August 1965. It was one year old at the time of the crash.

Accident
The aircraft took off at 3:59pm. Shortly after rotation the aircraft began to pitch up faster and higher than usual, the right wing dropped and the aircraft started turning to the right. The aircraft failed to gain speed and altitude, the right wingtip struck the ground and cartwheeled while disintegrating, the initial impact occurred  beyond the threshold and  right of runway 23, the aeroplane was completely destroyed.

Cause
The crash was due to reverse thrust applied during a simulated failure of no.4 engine on takeoff. The situation occurred when very rapid rearward movement of the power lever caused the associated thrust brake lever to enter the reverse idle position. After take-off, minimum control speed (MCS) required to overcome this abnormal state of thrust imbalance was never achieved. The condition was recognised by the pilots and rectified but there was not enough time nor altitude available to allow the aircraft to recover.

References

Air New Zealand accidents and incidents
Aviation accidents and incidents in 1966
Accidents and incidents involving the Douglas DC-8
Aviation accidents and incidents in New Zealand
1966 disasters in New Zealand 
1966 in New Zealand